Paksey is a town situated on the banks of the Padma River in Ishwardi Upazila–the westernmost Upazila of Pabna District in Rajshahi Division, Bangladesh.  Paksey is home to the Hardinge Bridge–a steel railway bridge named after Lord Hardinge who was the Viceroy of British India from 1910 to 1916. Paksey also serves as the western zone headquarters for the Bangladesh Railway. The road bridge, Lalon Shah Bridge, crosses the Padma at Paksey.

Name

Administration 

 Paksey Union Parishad, Paksey

Transport 

Paksey is a Railway Divisional Town. Their local airport is located at Ishwardi Upazila. Biman Bangladesh Airlines used to operate twice-weekly services to Ishwardi from Hazrat Shahjalal International Airport, Dhaka till 1990. Currently, United Airlines is operating Dhaka to Ishwardi daily. Paksey has a Railway station before crossing the Hardings Bridge (Dhaka to Khulna),

Industry 

Ishwardi Export Processing Zone is situated at Paksey.
North Bengal Paper Mills, Paksey
Bangladesh's one & only Nuclear Power Plant started in Paksey.

Education 
There are many famous educational institutions at Paksey.

Primary Schools

 M S Colony Government Primary School, Paksey, Pabna.
 Baghoil Primary School, Paksey, Pabna

Secondary High Schools 

Bangladesh Railway Chandraprabha Vidyapitha, Paksey, Pabna.
Bangladesh Railway Girl's High School , Paksey, Pabna.
North Bengal Paper Mill High school, Paksey, Pabna.
Baghail School and College, Paksey, Pabna
Ruppur Girls School, Paksey, Pabna
Ruppur High School, Paksey, Pabna

Coaching Centres 

★ Rainbow Student Care, Paksey, Pabna.

Colleges

 Bangladesh Railway Paksey College.

Health

 Bangladesh Railway Hospital, paksey, Pabna
 IEPZ Health Care, Paksey, Pabna

Culture

 About 99% of People are Muslim.

Notable persons

References

External links 
National Web Portal of Pabna
www.pabna.net
www.pabna.info
www.thebdnews.com
Pabna... an old town of Bangladesh
Web Portal of BEPZA

 Populated places in Pabna District